Paid Vacations (Seafarers) Convention, 1946 is an International Labour Organization Convention.

It was established in 1946, with the preamble stating:
Having decided upon the adoption of certain proposals with regard to holidays with pay for seafarers,...

The treaty has never been brought into force.

Modification 
The principles contained in the convention were subsequently revised and included in the ILO Convention C91, Paid Vacations (Seafarers) Convention (Revised), 1949 (shelved).

Ratifications
The convention has not been brought into force and is not binding upon any country that ratified it.

External links 
Text.
Ratifications and denunciations.

International Labour Organization conventions
Leave of absence
Treaties concluded in 1946
Admiralty law treaties
Treaties not entered into force
1946 in labor relations